Two Scottish League Cup finals were played in 1984:
1984 Scottish League Cup final (March), Rangers 3–2 Celtic
1984 Scottish League Cup final (October), Rangers 1–0 Dundee United